"Everybody Dies in Their Nightmares" is a song by American rapper  XXXTentacion from his debut studio album 17 (2017). It was produced by Potsu.

Composition
In the song, XXXTentacion raps in a rapid-fire rhythm and monotonous tone, in reflection of having suicidal thoughts and seemingly accepting his fate of doom.

Critical reception
"Everybody Dies in Their Nightmares" has been considered a "standout" song from 17 by music critics. XXL ranked it as the fifth best song by XXXTentacion in 2019.

Charts

Certifications

Notes

References

2017 songs
XXXTentacion songs
Songs written by XXXTentacion